Nikos Machlas (born 16 June 1973) is a retired Greek former professional footballer who played as a striker.

Club career

OFI Crete
Machlas began his career with OFI Crete, where he made his debut in February 1991 against Panionios. He stayed at the club for six seasons. He had the Dutch Eugène Gerards as a coach at OFI Crete.

Vitesse

Machlas signed for Dutch side Vitesse Arnhem in 1996 from Greece. He scored a disappointing 8 goals in 29 games in his first season in the Eredivisie, but in his second season he scored 34 goals in just 32 games, a feat which earned him the European Golden Boot for the 1997–98 season. He scored 60 goals in 92 matches for Vitesse.

Ajax
Machlas joined Eredivisie giant Ajax Amsterdam in June 1999 for a then-club record $8.6 million.
Despite netting 38 goals in 74 Eredivisie league games spread over three seasons, Machlas' goalscoring record was not deemed prolific enough for the demanding Ajax fans and coaching staff. The team went through a transition as poor results meant Machlas had to endure three coaches in as many years.
His place as striker became threatened by coach Ronald Koeman's preference for the younger strikers Zlatan Ibrahimović and Mido. His 12 goals in the 2001–02 season were nevertheless important in the run toward the first league title for Ajax in four years. Ajax also won the KNVB Beker that season, meaning they achieved the "double". At the start of the 2002–03 season, Koeman made it clear to Machlas that there was no future for him anymore in the first team of Ajax and was thus relegated to training and playing matches with the youth team. Eventually, the Greek striker and Ajax Amsterdam had split. "By mutual consent, Ajax and Nikos Machlas have terminated their contract. The termination takes effect immediately," Ajax said in a statement, adding that "the player could now join another club on a free transfer". 

After a brief (and frustrating) period in the Ajax youth team, he joined Spanish side Sevilla on loan for the rest of the season, with the Spanish club had an option to sign him on a three-year contract at the end of the season. The former Vitesse striker, who was the highest-paid player at Ajax, suffered further misery in Spain, after he was arrested for traffic offences. He made things worse by 'insulting and injuring' police officers who tried to arrest him after the offence had been committed. He scored just 2 goals in 14 appearances. Upon returning to Ajax, his contract was terminated in July 2003.
Before returning to Greece Machlas has emerged as a possible transfer target for Twente. Twente was in desperate need of an experienced striker capable of leading their attacking line next term. "We don't just want any striker," Tukkers chairman Herman Wessels told. "We need someone that fits in with us and makes us better."

Iraklis
The 30-year-old Greek international forward signed a one-year contract with Iraklis with the option of a further two seasons. He played under the man he calls his "footballing father", Dutch coach Eugène Gerards, who gave Machlas his break aged 18 at OFI Crete. He scored 10 goals in 26 appearances.

Return to OFI Crete
He returned to his first club, OFI Crete and stayed there for two seasons.
Upon the termination of his contract and after conflict with the club's chairman, he moved to APOEL, in Cyprus and signed a two years contract.

APOEL
In his first year at APOEL Machlas helped his team to win the Championship. On 17 May 2008, he announced his retirement after the end of the Cypriot Cup final, where APOEL beat 2–0 Anorthosis and clinched the title.

In 2009, he returned to his first club OFI Crete to take up the role of Sporting Director as they bid to return to the Greek Superleague.

International career
Machlas won 61 caps for the Greece national team and scored 18 goals. He also scored a crucial goal against Russia that led Greece to 1994 FIFA World Cup at only 20 years of age. He started each of Greece's group games in the USA though they lost all three, to Argentina, Nigeria and Bulgaria and failed to score a goal. He played his last game for Greece against Sweden in February 2002.

Career statistics

International
Scores and results list Greece's goal tally first, score column indicates score after each Machlas goal.

Honours
Ajax
Eredivisie: 2001–02
KNVB Cup: 2001–02

APOEL
Cypriot First Division: 2006–07
Cypriot Cup: 2007–08

Individual
Eredivisie top scorer: 1997–98
European Golden Boot: 1998

References

Living people
1973 births
Footballers from Heraklion
Greek footballers
Association football forwards
OFI Crete F.C. players
SBV Vitesse players
AFC Ajax players
Sevilla FC players
Iraklis Thessaloniki F.C. players
APOEL FC players
Super League Greece players
Eredivisie players
La Liga players
Cypriot First Division players
Greece international footballers
1994 FIFA World Cup players
Greek expatriate footballers
Greek expatriate sportspeople in the Netherlands
Expatriate footballers in the Netherlands
Greek expatriate sportspeople in Cyprus
Expatriate footballers in Cyprus